Oscar Yaroslav Mascorro Ábrego (born 11 February 1980) is a Mexican former professional footballer who played as a defender.

Honours
León
Apertura 2011-2012

References

External links

1980 births
Living people
Mexico under-20 international footballers
C.F. Monterrey players
San Luis F.C. players
Club Universidad Nacional footballers
Club Puebla players
Club León footballers
C.D. Veracruz footballers
Liga MX players
People from Ciudad Victoria
Footballers from Tamaulipas
Toros Neza footballers
Mexican footballers
Association football defenders